Run a Crooked Mile is a 1969 British made-for-television thriller film starring Louis Jourdan as Richard Stuart, an ordinary schoolteacher who, whilst on holiday, is a witness to a murder in a private secluded mansion.

When he reports this however, no evidence of any murder can be found, only a key on the floor. When he tries to investigate further he is knocked unconscious. He wakes up in a hospital room (after an apparent polo accident) and is astounded to discover that two years have elapsed during which he has been unhappily married to a beautiful woman (Mary Tyler Moore) and living a rich and extravagant life in Europe under the name Tony Sutton. Not only this, he has become mixed up in a plot to damage the whole European economy.

Acclaimed for its original premise, stylish photography (by Arthur Grant) and use of exotic locations, the film has managed to develop a cult following. In 2018, the film was released on DVD by the German Label PIDAX, with a running time of only 93 min.

Cast 
 Louis Jourdan - Richard Stuart
 Mary Tyler Moore - Elizabeth Sutton 
 Wilfrid Hyde-White - Dr. Ralph Sawyer 
 Stanley Holloway - Caretaker 
 Alexander Knox - Sir Howard Nettleton 
 Terence Alexander - Peter Martin 
 Ronald Howard - Insp. Huntington
 Laurence Naismith - Lord Dunnsfield 
 Norman Bird - Sgt. Hooper 
 Ernest Clark - Chairman 
 Bernard Archard - Business spokesman
 Margaret Nolan - Secretary
 Jean Anderson - Sister Teresa
 Nora Nicholson - Miss Abernathy

External links
 

American television films
1960s crime thriller films
1969 television films
1969 films
Films shot at Pinewood Studios
Films directed by Gene Levitt